The Adnan Hajj photographs controversy (also called Reutersgate) involves digitally manipulated photographs taken by Adnan Hajj, a Lebanese freelance photographer based in the Middle East, who had worked for Reuters over a period of more than ten years. Hajj's photographs were presented as part of Reuters' news coverage of the 2006 Lebanon War, but Reuters has admitted that at least two were significantly altered before being published.

Timeline
The first image was discovered on August 5, 2006 when blogger Charles Johnson of Little Green Footballs wrote that the first image "shows blatant evidence of manipulation" (Adobe Photoshop clone stamp), Reuters removed all of Hajj's photographs from their site; Hajj claimed to not have intentionally altered the photo but was trying to remove "dust marks". Reuters did not stand by the photographer and admitted that Hajj had altered it, saying "photo editing software was improperly used on this image. A corrected version will immediately follow this advisory. We are sorry for any inconvenience." Head of PR Moira Whittle said: "Reuters takes such matters extremely seriously as it is strictly against company editorial policy to alter pictures."

The second manipulated image was reported by the pseudonymous blogger "Dr. Rusty Shackleford" on his blog "The Jawa Report". Reuters captioned it as showing an Israeli F-16 fighter jet firing ground-attack missiles "during an air strike on Nabatiyeh", but the F-16 was actually deploying one defensive flare, and the original photograph showed only one flare. The photo had been doctored to increase the number of flares falling from the F-16 from one to three, and misidentified them as missiles.

On August 6, Reuters announced it would stop all cooperation with Adnan Hajj. Hajj claimed he had just been trying to remove dust marks, and that he made mistakes due to the bad lighting conditions he was working under. Critics point out that this is impossible, as Hajj's doctored image added an entire plume of smoke, duplicated several buildings, and showed a repeating pattern indicating that one plume of smoke was "cloned" several times.

On August 7, Reuters decided to withdraw all 920 photos by Hajj from sale. As of May 11, 2008, Reuters had removed all of Hajj's images from its site. On January 18, 2007 Reuters reported that an internal investigation into the Adnan Hajj photomanipulation had led to a top Reuters photo editor being fired.

The charges against Hajj took place within a larger context of many allegations about misleading photographs coming out of the Israel–Lebanon conflict.

See also

 2006 Lebanon War photographs controversies
 Arab–Israeli conflict
 Battle of Jenin (2002)
 Journalism scandals
 Media coverage of the Arab–Israeli conflict
 Muhammad al-Durrah controversy
 Pallywood
 Photo manipulation

References

External links
 Photo Fraud in Lebanon  on Aish.com
 "Digital Tampering in the Media, Politics and Law". Recent history of media photo manipulation. Hany Farid, professor, Dartmouth College. Last accessed August 7, 2006.
 "Institutional Failure at Reuters" by Thomas Lifson for Yahoo! News, August 7, 2006 (alternate link).
 "Reuters' Image Problem" by Brendan Bernhard in the LA Weekly online, August 9, 2006.
 A Concise History of the Fauxtography Blogstorm in the 2006 Lebanon War by Stephen D. Cooper, Marshall University

2006 Lebanon War
Reuters
Photography in Lebanon
Photojournalism controversies
2006 in mass media